Bryn Powell (born 5 September 1979) is a Wales international rugby league footballer who played professionally for Hunslet Hawks, Salford City Reds, Featherstone Rovers (Heritage No. 861) (two spells), Dewsbury Rams in National League One.

Career
Powell started his professional career at Hunslet Hawks. In 2004, Powell played two Super League games for Salford City Reds. After one season at Featherstone Rovers, he moved to Dewsbury Rams, where he spent several years.

Bryn Powell made his début for Featherstone Rovers on Sunday 13 February 2005, and he played his last match for Featherstone Rovers, in his second spell, during the 2011 season.

Powell also represented Wales at international level, and was capped six times between 2004 and 2006. He was named in the Wales squad to face England at the Keepmoat Stadium prior to England's departure for the 2008 Rugby League World Cup, but had to withdraw.

References

External links
(archived by web.archive.org) Dewsbury Rams profile

1979 births
Dewsbury Rams players
Featherstone Rovers players
Living people
Place of birth missing (living people)
Salford Red Devils players
Wales national rugby league team players
Welsh rugby league players
Hunslet R.L.F.C. players
Rugby league wingers